The 1951 Ulster Trophy was a non-championship Formula One motor race held on 2 June 1951 at the Dundrod Circuit, in Northern Ireland. The race was won by Alfa Romeo driver Giuseppe Farina. Farina also set pole position and fastest lap.

Classification

Race

References

Ulster Trophy
Ulster Trophy
Ulster Trophy